Gibbons Bagnall (1719–1800) was an English poetical writer.

Bagnall was the son of Gibbons Bagnall of Windsor. He was admitted to Balliol College, Oxford, 12 July 1738, where he proceeded B.A. 30 April 1741. He afterwards went to King's College, Cambridge, where he took the degree of M.A. in 1760. Taking orders, he became vicar of Holm Lacy in Herefordshire, and head-master of the free school at Hereford. He was collated on 27 May 1760 to the prebend of Piona Parva in the church of Hereford, and on 1 Aug. 1767 to the prebend of Barsham in the same cathedral establishment. He also held for some time the rectory of Upton Bishop: and in 1783 he was presented to the vicarage of Sellack. He died on 31 December 1800, in his 82nd year.

Works
A Sermon on Exodus XV. 20, 1762, 8vo. 
Education: an Essay, in verse, London, 1765, 4to. 
A New Translation of Telemachus, in English verse, 2 vols., Hereford, 1790, 8vo; 2 vols., Dublin, 1792, 12mo.

References

External links
New Translation of Telemachus, in English verse, 2 vols., Hereford, 1790, 8vo; 2 vols., Dublin, 1792, 12mo. via Google Books

1719 births
1800 deaths
18th-century English poets
18th-century English people
Alumni of Balliol College, Oxford
Alumni of King's College, Cambridge
English Christian religious leaders
English male poets
18th-century English male writers
18th-century English writers